Eugenie Ann Francis (born May 26, 1962) is an American actress. She is best known for playing the role of Laura Spencer on the television soap opera General Hospital from 1977 to present, for which she won a Daytime Emmy Award in 2007.

Francis also appeared in the soap operas Days of Our Lives from 1987 to 1989, All My Children from 1990 to 1992 and The Young and the Restless from 2011 to 2012.

Early life
Francis was born in Englewood, New Jersey. Her father was Canadian actor Ivor Francis. Her mother, Rosemary Daley, is a former actress/model of Lithuanian descent. Genie has an older brother, Ivor Jr.; a younger brother, Kenneth; and an older half-sister, Shelley, from her father's first marriage.

Career
Francis began acting in the two part episode titled "Jury Duty" on the television series Family. Her biggest role came in 1977 with Laura Spencer on General Hospital as she was a recast. It would bring her instant stardom in the late 1970s. The television couple of Luke and Laura wed on November 17, 1981, with 30 million viewers tuning in to make the episode the highest-rated hour in soap opera history. At the peak of her success, Francis left the series in 1982 to try her hand at prime-time television. Soon afterward, she landed a starring role in her own series, Bare Essence, which was unsuccessful. She returned to General Hospital in 1983 for a limited run, to coincide with the departure of Luke when Anthony Geary decided to leave the series. Francis was also offered the lead role for the movie Splash but turned it down because she thought the script was silly.

In 1984, 1986 and 1990, Francis guest starred on Murder, She Wrote as Jessica Fletcher's niece Victoria. In 1985, she starred in the miniseries North and South as Brett Main Hazard. Francis would reprise her role of Brett Main Hazard in 1986 and 1994 in the miniseries North and South: Book II and Heaven and Hell: North and South Book III respectively. In 1993, she starred in the television film Perry Mason: The Case of the Killer Kiss as Kris Buckner which was based on the CBS television series of the same name. In 1996, Francis provided the voice of Betty Ross on the Incredible Hulk animated series that ran on UPN.

Through the years, Francis has appeared on numerous other daytime soaps. She starred on Days of Our Lives as Diana Colville (a reporter who became involved with John Black, at the time believing himself to be Roman Brady) from 1987 to 1989 and on All My Children as con artist and incest victim Ceara Connor Hunter from 1990 to 1992. She reprised her role as Ceara on Loving in a crossover storyline in November 1991. Ceara was "killed off" when her character prepared to move to that soap's town of Corinth (although it was an unseen extra stepping off the bus into the line of fire), and years later, Laura also appeared in Corinth on General Hospital when ex-husband Luke found her tied up in the Alden family basement. She then returned to General Hospital in 1993. In 1994, when Francis became pregnant with her first child, the pregnancy was written into the show and she took six weeks off for maternity leave. However, in early 1997, when she was pregnant again, she took a much longer absence from the show, staying away for nearly a year and a half. Francis abruptly left General Hospital in 2002 due to contract issues.

In 2004, Francis appeared in Teacher's Pet and Thunderbirds. In June 2006, she began negotiating with the casting directors on the show to return to the role of Laura Spencer for a limited run through November. Francis returned with spectacular fanfare to commemorate the 25th anniversary of Luke and Laura's wedding. Though she reprised the role for only one month, Francis' stint garnered her a Daytime Emmy Nomination for Outstanding Supporting Actress in a Drama Series, which she won in June 2007. Francis returned to General Hospital in August 2008 to reprise her role, appearing until November 12. In December 2008, she had a starring role in the Hallmark Channel movie, The Note, which earned her critical acclaim. On January 31, 2009, Francis reprised her role of Peyton MacGruder in the Hallmark Channel movie, Taking a Chance on Love. In 2012, she again reprised her role as Peyton MacGruder in the Hallmark Channel movie Notes from the Heart Healer.

In March 2011, it was announced that Francis would join The Young and the Restless as Genevieve Atkinson, the long-absent birth mother of Cane Ashby. With her appearance, she was reunited with former General Hospital co-star Tristan Rogers, who portrayed Colin Atkinson, Cane's estranged biological father. She received her second Daytime Emmy nomination in the category of Outstanding Supporting Actress in a Drama Series for her role as Genevieve in May 2012.

On September 13, 2012, it was announced that Francis had been let go from her role on The Young and the Restless due to budget cuts. On January 8, 2013, executive producer Frank Valentini and Entertainment Weekly confirmed that Francis would return to General Hospital, first airing on February 11. However, she remained with the series for only five months, as Laura departed for medical treatment in France, returning on June 5, 2015, as part of a storyline to help facilitate Anthony Geary's departure from the show and would later sign a contract to remain with the show. In January 2018, Francis was dropped to recurring status and in late July 2018 signed a contract to return to General Hospital full-time.

Other projects
Francis owned a store called The Cherished Home. It was located at 31 Searsport Avenue, Belfast, Maine 04915, and they also sold items online. The store sold cottage furnishings and home accessories. Francis sold the store in August 2012, due to her workload on The Young and the Restless.  The store closed in the fall of 2012.

In May 2007, Francis began appearing in magazine advertisements as a spokesperson for the Medifast Diet, claiming she lost 30 pounds as of December 2007, using the diet.

In November 2009, Francis along with her brothers, Ivor Jr. and Kenneth released It's Christmas Time Again. They decided to donate a part of all record sales to the Sisters of Saint Francis Children's Mission in Cuernavaca, a mission founded by her cousin Sister Margaret. Francis decided to donate all of her proceeds/sales to this mission. This endeavor was a project involving various members of her family.

Personal life
Francis first met actor/director Jonathan Frakes in 1982 while filming the television miniseries Bare Essence. After meeting again in 1984 during the filming of the miniseries North and South, Francis and Frakes began dating in 1985. They became engaged the following year, and were married on May 28, 1988. The couple has two children, Jameson Ivor Frakes and Elizabeth Frances Frakes.  After residing in  Belfast, Maine, they moved to Beverly Hills, California, in 2008 and later relocated to Calabasas, California.

Filmography

Film

Television

Videos

Awards and nominations

References

Notes

  Originally published by Signet in 1982.

Citations

Sources

External links
 
 
 Genie Francis Discusses Her Christmas CD 
 Genie Francis profile at Soap Central
 Genie Francis to Guest Star in Web Series
 

1962 births
20th-century American actresses
21st-century American actresses
American people of Canadian descent
American people of Lithuanian descent
American soap opera actresses
American television actresses
Daytime Emmy Award winners
Daytime Emmy Award for Outstanding Supporting Actress in a Drama Series winners
Living people
People from Calabasas, California
People from Englewood, New Jersey